Marcelo Signorelli (born January 8, 1963) is an Italian-Uruguayan professional basketball coach, book author and former player. He has two daughters named Valentina (33) and Paulina (21). His father Americo Signorelli was a journalist recognized in Uruguay. He served as the head coach of the Uruguayan National Basketball Team from 2016 to 2018.

In 2016, he held the head coach position of the Correcaminos Colon of the Liga Panameña de Baloncesto, Panama's first division, and the international FIBA Americas League.

References

External links
 Eurobasket.com profile
 RealGM profile

Videos
 MARCELO SIGNORELLI - DT Basket en La Chacra Interview (Youtube.com video) 

1963 births
Living people
Basketball coaches
Uruguayan basketball coaches
Italian basketball coaches
Uruguayan people of Italian descent
Sportspeople from Montevideo